Thomas Everett Scott (born September 7, 1970) is an American actor. His film work includes a starring role as drummer Guy Patterson in the film That Thing You Do!, the protagonist in An American Werewolf in Paris, and notable roles in Boiler Room, One True Thing, Dead Man on Campus, The Love Letter, Because I Said So, Danger One, La La Land, and Clouds. 

In television, he played the roles of Detective Russell Clarke in the series Southland, Charles Garnett in Z Nation, and played the recurring roles of Eric Wyczenski in ER, Sam Landon in Beauty & the Beast, Kevin Duval in the series Scream, William in Reign, and Mr. Down in 13 Reasons Why. He also co-starred in the truTV sitcom I'm Sorry.

Early life
Scott was born in East Bridgewater, Massachusetts, the son of Cynthia "Cindy" (née Pierce), an insurance sales representative, and William Joseph "Bill" Scott (died 2007), a civil engineer. He graduated from Syracuse University in 1992, where he started out as a communications major, but eventually majored in drama.

Career

After appearing in an episode of Law & Order and a commercial for Crest toothpaste in 1993, Scott's first notable role was as Matthew for several seasons on the television situation comedy Grace Under Fire. He played the title character's illegitimate son, whom she had placed for adoption. In 1996, Scott landed the role of Guy Patterson in the film That Thing You Do! He was almost passed over because of his resemblance to the film's director, actor Tom Hanks, but Hanks's wife, Rita Wilson, encouraged Hanks to cast Scott in the role.

Scott has had several other roles; he was the lead in the films An American Werewolf in Paris and Dead Man on Campus, and co-starred with Kate Capshaw and Tom Selleck in The Love Letter. He starred in the cult film Boiler Room and made an uncredited cameo in Van Wilder. He has had recurring roles on the television series ER in 2002 and 2003 and has played numerous minor parts in other films and television shows such as Will & Grace and Sons of Anarchy. He co-starred in the series Philly as a lawyer, partnering with Kim Delaney. The show was a critical success but suffered poor ratings and was cancelled after one season.  He also starred in Saved, a medical drama series on TNT. He starred in the television film Surrender Dorothy. He appeared as one of Mandy Moore's character's boyfriends in the comedy Because I Said So, and starred in a Broadway theatre comedy, The Little Dog Laughed, as closeted film star Mitchell Green, written by Douglas Carter Beane. He starred as Jack Cutting on the ABC's brief comedy drama series Cashmere Mafia (2008). In 2009, he appeared in four episodes of Law & Order playing the fictional Governor of New York, Don Shalvoy. He also played Detective Russell Clarke in the seven episodes of the first season of Southland, which was dropped by NBC and subsequently picked up by TNT. At the start of second season, he became a recurring character appearing in three of six episodes. In the third and fifth seasons, he continued to appear in selected episodes.

Scott had supporting roles in other films such as Race to Witch Mountain, Tanner Hall, Mars Needs Moms, Parental Guidance, Enemies Closer, Sister Cities, and portrayed an affable but amoral paramedic in Danger One. His former television roles include Sam Landon in Beauty and the Beast, Kevin Duval in Scream, Charles Garnett in Z Nation, and William in Reign. In 2016, he appeared in the film La La Land. In 2017, he co-starred in the film Diary of a Wimpy Kid: The Long Haul, and was a series regular on the TruTV sitcom I'm Sorry, starring alongside Andrea Savage for two seasons.

Personal life
Scott married Jenni Gallagher, whom he met at Syracuse University, on December 13, 1997. They have two children.

Filmography

Film

Television

Video games

References

External links

 

1970 births
20th-century American male actors
21st-century American male actors
American male film actors
American male stage actors
American male television actors
American male video game actors
American male voice actors
Living people
Male actors from Massachusetts
People from East Bridgewater, Massachusetts
Syracuse University alumni